Duarte Lôbo da Gama was the first captain-general of Portuguese Cape Verde, from 7 August 1587 to 25 March 1591.

Bibliography
História de Portugal - Dicionário de Personalidades (vol. XV)

References

Colonial heads of Cape Verde
16th-century births
Portuguese colonial governors and administrators
16th-century Portuguese people
Year of death unknown